San Francesco d'Assisi is a baroque-style, former Roman Catholic church located in the town of Oria, province of Brindisi, Apulia, Italy.

History
The church was erected of acquired shortly after a visit by St Francis himself. It appears to have been a small church dedicated to the Madonna di Costantinopoli, and officiated by the Basilian monks. In 1219, a Franciscan order convent was erected alongside. The interior houses the relics of the Blessed Francesco da Durazzo  and a statue of the Pietà litica once housed in the rural church of the Madonna di Gallana.

References

Churches in the province of Brindisi
13th-century Roman Catholic church buildings in Italy